Culong, also known as the Thomas Cooper Ferebee House and Forbes House, is a historic home located near Shawboro, Currituck County, North Carolina. It was built in 1812, and is a two-story, three bay by three bay, Federal style frame dwelling with a gable roof. It has two wing additions and a one-story front portico.  Also on the property are two contributing outbuildings and family cemetery.

It was listed on the National Register of Historic Places in 1980.

References

External links
 

Historic American Buildings Survey in North Carolina
Houses on the National Register of Historic Places in North Carolina
Federal architecture in North Carolina
Houses completed in 1812
Houses in Currituck County, North Carolina
National Register of Historic Places in Currituck County, North Carolina